Marcellus Hugh Evans (September 22, 1884 – November 21, 1953) was an American lawyer and politician who served three terms as a  U.S. Representative from New York from 1935 to 1941.

Life
Born in Brooklyn, he attended St. John the Baptist School and St. James Academy in Brooklyn and was graduated from Fordham University School of Law in 1910. He was admitted to the bar in 1910, and practiced law in Brooklyn.

Political career 
He was a member of the New York State Assembly (Kings Co., 12th D.) in 1922, 1923, 1924, 1925 and 1926.

He was a member of the New York State Senate (6th D.) from 1927 to 1934, sitting in the 150th, 151st, 152nd, 153rd, 154th, 155th, 156th and 157th New York State Legislatures.

Congress 
Evans was elected as a Democrat to the 74th, 75th and 76th United States Congresses, holding office from January 3, 1935, to January 3, 1941. He was an unsuccessful candidate in 1940 for renomination as a Democrat and for election as a Republican to the 77th Congress.

Later career and death 
He resumed the practice of law and died in Brooklyn on November 21, 1953. Interment was in Calvary Cemetery, Queens.

References

External links

Marcellus H. Evans at The Political Graveyard

1884 births
1953 deaths
Burials at Calvary Cemetery (Queens)
Politicians from Brooklyn
Fordham University School of Law alumni
Members of the New York State Assembly
New York (state) state senators
New York (state) lawyers
Democratic Party members of the United States House of Representatives from New York (state)
New York (state) Republicans
20th-century American politicians
20th-century American lawyers
Members of the United States House of Representatives from New York (state)